Arabesque is a 1966 American comedy thriller spy film directed by Stanley Donen and starring Gregory Peck and Sophia Loren, written by Julian Mitchell, Stanley Price, and Peter Stone based on The Cipher, a 1961 novel by Alex Gordon (pseudonym of Gordon Cotler). The film, along with Donen's immediately prior film Charade (1963), is usually described as being "Hitchcockian", as it features as a protagonist an innocent and ordinary man thrust into dangerous and extraordinary situations. It was the last film of that genre which Donen would make.

Arabesque was filmed in Technicolor and Panavision and was distributed by Universal Pictures.

Plot

In an undercover mission, Major Sloane kills Professor Ragheeb, an ancient hieroglyphics expert at Oxford University and steals a hieroglyph-encrypted message. Sloane then asks Professor David Pollock, who has taken over Ragheeb's class on hieroglyphics, to meet with shipping magnate Nejim Beshraavi on a business matter. David declines but changes his mind after being forced to enter a car, where he meets the prime minister of an unnamed Middle Eastern country, Hassan Jena and his ambassador to the United Kingdom, Mohammed Lufti. Jena asks David to accept Beshraavi's offer of employment.

David meets Beshraavi, who asks him to decode the inscription on the piece of paper Sloane stole. David is attracted to Beshraavi's girlfriend Yasmin Azir, who tells him that Beshraavi had Ragheeb killed and will do the same to him once he decodes the message. Their conversation is interrupted by Beshraavi. David keeps hidden until Sloane brings it to Beshraavi's attention that David and the cipher are missing. Overhearing the conversation, David wraps the cipher in a candy in his pocket, among others, a red one with the number "9". As Beshraavi's men search for David, Beshraavi demonstrates to one of Yasmin's employees, Hemsley, that he can buy people for their loyalty or else exact extreme revenge.  Forced to show himself, David seemingly abducts Yasmin. They flee from one of Beshraavi's henchmen, Mustapha. In the course of the chase, Mustapha and David struggle at the zoological gardens, when another man intervenes and kills Mustapha. He identifies himself as Inspector Webster with CID. When a guard approaches, Webster kills him before revealing that he is working with Yasmin. Webster knocks David unconscious.

David awakes in a moving panel van in the presence of Webster, Yasmin and another of Yasmin's boyfriends, Yussef Kassim, who is looking for the cipher. David, seeing the bag of candies on a shelf in the van, tells Yussef that Beshraavi has the cipher. They use truth serum on David, after which he talks what they believe is gibberish about the number "9". Believing that he was telling the truth about Beshraavi, Yussef tells Yasmin to work on Beshraavi while they throw David out of the vehicle.

The next morning, Yasmin arrives home and tells Beshraavi that Yussef, for whom the cipher was originally intended, killed David and Mustapha but does not yet know the coded message. While Yasmin believes Beshraavi has the cipher, Beshraavi states that David must still have it. Later, Yasmin bursts into David's apartment as he finishes a phone conversation with Jena. She convinces him that she hates Yussef and pretends to help him because his boss, a General Ali orchestrating a military takeover, has her mother and sisters hostage. She tells him he needs to crack the cipher so she can report back to the embassy, which will ensure their safety.

David and Yasmin go to the construction site Yussef uses as his front. They spot the van but Webster takes the candies to eat. Following him, David and Yasmin watch him discover the cipher and telephone someone from a phone booth; they learn that person is Beshraavi, with whom Webster is entering into a double cross against Yussef. Beshraavi and Webster are to meet at the Ascot racetrack.

At Ascot on race day, Yasmin is with Beshraavi, while David searches for Webster. David and Yasmin make plans to meet at 9:00 p.m. that evening at Trafalgar Square, after David gets the cipher from Webster. At the track, David spots Webster rendezvousing with Sloane, who hands over an envelope of money. David knocks the cipher out of Webster's hand and the envelope floats into the track with the horses approaching. As David and Webster struggle, Sloane attempts to stab David but accidentally kills Webster. David runs onto the track and retrieves the cipher just before the horses gallop by.

David makes copies of the cipher, mailing the original to himself for safekeeping. At a news stand he then notices newspaper headlines which implicate him as Webster's killer. David believes that Mrs. Ragheeb may know something important about the cipher. He visits her at home and shows it to her, also giving her the news that her husband has been killed (she was living secluded and had not heard).  Mrs. Ragheeb examines the cipher and tears it up in frustration, implying that she knew that Ragheeb was working on something dangerous. David also tells her that he is working with Yasmin, whose mother and sisters are in danger at the hands of General Ali. Mrs. Ragheeb replies that Yasmin is lying, in that she has no mother or sisters, only a father who happens to be General Ali.

That night, David hops into Yasmin's car and they drive off. Angry at Yasmin's deceit, David lies, telling her that he does not have the cipher with him but has decoded the message and makes up a nonsense meaning to tell her. She relays that information to the embassy via telephone regardless. David and Yasmin arrange to meet later at the hotel where he is staying. After she drops him off, David flags down a taxi and follows her to Yussef's construction site. David sees Yussef operating a wrecking ball, swinging it repeatedly attempting to kill Yasmin. David rushes to save her and Yussef is electrocuted to death by a live wire.

David determines that the hieroglyphics are simply a version of the nursery rhyme "Goosey Goosey Gander".  He then looks for secret writing on it, such as invisible ink and getting it wet the ink washes away, leaving a speck which he determines is a microdot.  At a scientific store they examine the dot under a microscope and it reads "Beshraavi plans assassinate Jena twelve thirty June eighteenth" which is in 20 minutes.  They don't know where to go, until Yasmin sees on a newscast that Jena has just landed at the airport.  David and Yasmin make it to the airport a few minutes before 12:30, where David shoves past security guards to Jena, who is beginning a welcoming speech. David knocks Jena to the ground just as bullets from Sloane's machine gun land where Jena was just standing. Lufti then shoots Jena dead with a pistol. Yasmin whisks David off and convinces him that the man who was just shot is only an imposter of Jena.

They discover that the real Jena was abducted by Beshraavi and locked in a trunk in the back of a truck. David and Yasmin hide in the truck and free Jena just as the van arrives at Beshraavi's country estate.  David, Yasmin and Jena quickly escape on horses from his stables, being pursued through crop fields by a farm combine with sharp blades. Beshraavi and Sloane also pursue them in a helicopter. As they cross the disused Crumlin steel-girder railway viaduct, David drops a wooden ladder down into the rotors of the helicopter as it passes underneath, causing it to crash and burn. David and Yasmin end up in romantic bliss, on a punt back at Oxford.

Cast

 Gregory Peck as Prof. David Pollock
 Sophia Loren as Yasmin Azir
 Alan Badel as Nejim Beshraavi
 Kieron Moore as Yussef Kasim
 Carl Duering as Prime Minister Hassan Jena
 John Merivale as Maj. Sylvester Pennington Sloane
 Duncan Lamont as Kyle Webster
 George Coulouris as Ragheeb
 Ernest Clark as Beauchamp
 Harold Kasket as Mohammed Lufti
 Gordon Griffin as Fanshaw

Production
The original working title for the film was "Crisscross", which was later changed to "Cipher" before becoming Arabesque.

Producer/director Stanley Donen wanted Cary Grant for the role of Pollock after working with him in his previous film Charade, and the dialogue for Pollock was written with Grant in mind. However, Donen was later quoted as saying,

[Grant] didn't want to be in it ... It wasn't a good script and I didn't want to make it, but Gregory Peck and Sophia Loren, whom I loved, wanted to be in it and the studio implored me to make it, because, they said, 'It's ridiculous not to make a film with Peck and Sophia.' They said it would make money, and they were right.

Donen later estimated that $400,000 was spent on the script alone and cinematographer Christopher Challis recalled that the film went through several rewrites. Challis said that "The more the script was rewritten, the worse it got." With Peck and Loren already contracted to do the film, Challis recalled that Donen told him "Our only hope is to make it so visually exciting the audience will never have time to work out what the hell is going on".

Peter Stone, who was brought in very late to make improvements in the dialogue, said that Donen "shot it better than he ever shot any picture. Everything was shot as though it were a reflection in a Rolls-Royce headlamp." Donen described his technique in shooting the film:

I had hoped to avoid any sign of the studio manner this time, so I tried something like the "living camera" technique. The hand-held camera had been used a lot lately, especially in Europe, but the trouble had been too much wobble because the operator has to carry the sheer weight of the camera while he's working. One of our boys had the idea of suspending the camera ... to give the operator all the mobility of the hand camera without the weight ... Arabesque is sort of going to the extreme until it almost makes you sick. Granted, we did do some interesting photographic things.

Peck said about Donen that

Stanley had a terrific instinct, like a choreographer, which, of course, he had been.  But even in an ordinary dramatic sequence he'd use the body to punctuate what was happening — standing, relaxing, everything, it was all choreographed. If you look at the picture, we were always moving, because Stanley just wanted to keep the ball in the air the entire time, and he used every camera trick you could think of. He also loved filming Sophia's decolletage and her rear end.

Sophia Lorens' request for 20 different pair of shoes for her character led to her lover in the film being described as having a foot fetish. In a chase scene Peck, who had been injured years earlier in a horse-riding accident, could not run fast enough to keep up with Loren, who kept pulling ahead.  Peck implored his co-star to run slower, reminding her that he was supposed to be rescuing her, but Loren asked Donen to make Peck run faster.  Since Peck was in pain, Donen had to persuade Loren to run slower to make filming the scene possible.

Many internal and external scenes were shot at Tyringham Hall in Buckinghamshire. At the time the building was a disaster recovery site owned by the ANZ Banking Group and was largely unused and unfurnished.  The railway bridge action scene was filmed on the historic Crumlin Viaduct in Crumlin, Caerphilly, which was being dismantled at the time.

Loren's character drove a Mercedes-Benz 230SL. The Rolls-Royce Phantom IV which appears in the film was originally owned by Prince Henry, Duke of Gloucester - it is one of only eighteen Phantom IV examples ever built.

Reception
Arabesque received mixed to positive reviews from critics and audiences, earning a 74% approval rating on Rotten Tomatoes.  It was a box office success. Boxoffice Magazine called it "a spy adventure par excellence" and wrote that it was "in the best Alfred Hitchcock vein and ranks among the year's best."  Variety wrote, "Arabesque packs certain salable ingredients...but...fault lies in a shadowy plot line and confusing characters, particularly in the miscasting of Peck in a cute role."

Awards and honors

See also
 List of American films of 1966

Notes
Informational notes

References

External links

 
 
 
 
 

1966 films
1960s action comedy films
1960s spy comedy films
1960s thriller films
American action adventure films
1960s English-language films
Films based on American novels
Films based on thriller novels
Films directed by Stanley Donen
Universal Pictures films
American spy comedy films
American comedy thriller films
Films shot at Pinewood Studios
Films set in England
Films scored by Henry Mancini
1966 comedy films
1960s American films